or  is an unpopulated island in Hammerfest Municipality in Troms og Finnmark county, Norway. Håja is located in the Sørøysundet strait, between the larger islands of Kvaløya to the east, Seiland to the south, and Sørøya to the northwest.

On the island, there is a gull colony. Locals use the island for picking seagull eggs and berries, traditional ingredients of North Norwegian cuisine.

Several companies and institutions in Hammerfest have been named after Håja, including a kindergarten.

References 

Hammerfest
Islands of Troms og Finnmark